Yorkshire has many tall buildings, the current tallest building is Altus House in Leeds. Sheffield also has tall buildings and there are many planned to be built elsewhere. York has a low-rise skyline like other Yorkshire cities, York's tallest building being the Minster.

High-rise residential blocks are common in many towns and cities in Yorkshire, with many councils, particularly Leeds, Halifax and Kingston upon Hull enthusiastically embracing high-rise living in the 1960s and '70s.  Sheffield has fewer high-rise residential blocks, with the council there looking more towards the more modern 'wall like' developments.

{| class="wikitable"
|-
! Rank
! Name
! Height (m)
! Height (ft)
! Floors 
! Year
! City 
! class="unsortable"| Image
!Ref
|- 
| align=center|1
| Altus House
| 114.3
| 375 
| align=center|38
| align=center|2021
|align=left|Leeds
|
|
|-
| 2
| Bridgewater Place||110||||32||2007||Leeds||
|
|-
| 3
| Sky Plaza||103||||36||2009||Leeds||
|
|-
| 4
| St Paul's Tower||101||||32||2010||Sheffield||
|
|-
| 5
| Opal 3||82||||26||2008||Leeds||
|
|-
| 6
| Pinnacle||80||||20||1973||Leeds||
|
|-
| 7
| UNITE White Rose View Tower 1||79||||28||2020||Leeds||
|
|-
| 8
| Arts Tower||78||||20||1965||Sheffield||
|
|-
| 9
| Park Plaza Hotel||77||||20||1965||Leeds||
|
|-
| 10
| Arena Point||77||||20||1967||Leeds||
|
|-
| 11
| Royal Hallamshire Hospital||76||||17||1974||Sheffield|| 
|
|-
| 12
| K2||74||||20||1972||Leeds||
|
|-
| 13
| Cottingley Towers||72||||25||1972||Leeds||
|
|-
| 14
| Centre North East||71||||19||1974||Middlesbrough||
|
|-
| 15
| Symons House||70||||22||2020||Leeds||
|
|-
| 16
| Candle House||69||||23||2009||Leeds||
|
|-
| 17
| Broadcasting Tower||69||||23||2009||Leeds||
|
|-
| 18
| Velocity Tower||66||||22||2009||Sheffield||
|
|-
| 19
| New Era Square||66||||21||2018||Sheffield||
|
|-
| 20
| West Point||65||||17||1975||Leeds||
|
|-
| 21
| The Gate||64||||21||2020||Sheffield||
|
|}

Tallest under construction

See also
 List of tallest buildings in Leeds
 List of tallest buildings in Sheffield

References 

Lists of tallest buildings in the United Kingdom
Tallest